Prince Karl Anton August of Schleswig-Holstein-Sonderburg-Beck (10 August 1727, in Marburg12 September 1759, in Stettin) was the son of Peter August, Duke of Schleswig-Holstein-Sonderburg-Beck and Princess Sophie of Hesse-Philippsthal.

Marriage and issue
On 30 May 1754, Anton (as he was known) married Countess Frederica Charlotte of Dohna-Schlodien in Leistenau (3 July 173821 April 1785) in Königsberg. The couple had one child, Friedrich Karl Ludwig, Duke of Schleswig-Holstein-Sonderburg-Beck (20 August 175724 April 1816).

Anton would have inherited the dukedom of Schleswig-Holstein-Sonderburg-Beck had it not been for his early death by wounds suffered at the Battle of Kunersdorf. His father Peter outlived him, so the dukedom was passed on from Peter to Anton's only son, Friedrich.

Ancestry

References

1727 births
1759 deaths
House of Schleswig-Holstein-Sonderburg-Beck
Prussian military personnel
German military personnel killed in action